Scholes (the sch is pronounced sh or sk) may refer to:

United Kingdom
Scholes, in St Helens, Merseyside.
Scholes, Greater Manchester, in Wigan
Scholes, South Yorkshire in the Rotherham borough
Scholes, Cleckheaton, Kirklees, West Yorkshire
Scholes, Holme Valley, Kirklees, West Yorkshire
Scholes, Leeds, West Yorkshire
Barwick in Elmet and Scholes, a civil parish
Scholes, Bradford, a hamlet near Oakworth, West Yorkshire
Scholes Coppice, an area of ancient woodland located, Rotherham, South Yorkshire

United States
Scholes International Airport at Galveston, Texas
Scholes Library, Alfred University, New York

People
Arthur Scholes (born 1890), Canadian long-distance runner
Carl Scholes. (Born 1969), British businessmen, Director Aspect Building Solutions
Clarke Scholes (1930–2010), American competition swimmer and Olympic champion
Dennis Scholes, rugby league footballer who played in the 1940s, 1950s and 1960s
France Vinton Scholes (1897–1979), American scholar and historian
George Scholes (1928–2004), Canadian ice hockey player, competed in the 1956 Winter Olympics
Gordon Scholes AO (born 1931), former Australian politician and Speaker of the Australian House of Representatives
Jack Scholes (1917–1989), sailor from New Zealand
James Christopher Scholes (1852–1890), English antiquary

Katherine Scholes (born 1959), Australian writer
Ken Scholes (born 1968), science fiction and fantasy writer living in St. Helens, Oregon
Malcolm Scholes (1924–2008), British Royal Air Force (RAF) pilot in World War II
Mark Scholes (born 1957), Australian cricket player
Myron Scholes (born 1941), Canadian, Nobel Prize–winning economist and creator of the Black-Scholes model
Black–Scholes, a mathematical formula used in economics
Paul Scholes (born 1974), English footballer
Percy Scholes (1877–1958), English musician and journalist
Robert Scholes (1929–2016), American literary critic and theorist
Robert Scholes (politician) (1866–1929), American politician
Roger Scholes (born 1950), independent film and television maker since 1983
Rory Scholes (born 1993), Irish rugby union player
Theophilus Scholes (1858–1940), Baptist missionary, medical doctor and political commentator
Wayne Scholes, British businessman, CEO of Red Touch Media
William L. Scholes (1926–2002), American politician

See also 
Scoles and Schoales, surnames
Sholes (disambiguation)
Scales (surname)
Coles (disambiguation)